Sukhwinder ("Gabbar") Singh (born 15 November 1978 in Batala, India) is an Indian-born Canadian field hockey player, who is a member of the Canada national field hockey team that won the gold medal at the 2007 Pan American Games. He plays in the Premier League in Vancouver, Canada for United Brothers Field Hockey Club. Gabbar started playing hockey in India at a young age and by the time he reached his late teenage years, he was already playing for Punjab Police, a well recognized team in India. His recent matches are his Australian tour and also the 7 test series against India in British Columbia, Canada

References
Canadian Olympic Committee
Profile
sikhhockeyolympians

External links
 

1978 births
Living people
Canadian male field hockey players
Field hockey players at the 2007 Pan American Games
Field hockey players at the 2008 Summer Olympics
Field hockey players at the 2011 Pan American Games
Olympic field hockey players of Canada
Field hockey people from British Columbia
Canadian sportspeople of Indian descent
Canadian people of Punjabi descent
Sportspeople from Gurdaspur district
Indian male field hockey players
Indian emigrants to Canada
Naturalized citizens of Canada
World Series Hockey players
Pan American Games gold medalists for Canada
Pan American Games silver medalists for Canada
Field hockey players from Punjab, India
Pan American Games medalists in field hockey
Medalists at the 2007 Pan American Games
Medalists at the 2011 Pan American Games
2010 Men's Hockey World Cup players